Claudia Miriam Gonson (born April 5, 1968) is an American musician best known for her work with The Magnetic Fields. She often provides the band lead vocals as well as performing the piano or drums. She is also the band's manager.

Gonson met Stephin Merritt in high school in the early 80's, and the pair have worked together ever since.

While in high school at Concord Academy, Gonson performed in her first band, the Zinnias, in which Stephin Merritt wrote or co-wrote most of the band's material with John Gage. The band broke up when Gonson left to attend Columbia University. Gonson later returned to the Boston area to attend Harvard University, and joined the group Lazy Susan, which also included Therese Bellino and Shirley Simms.

She has since performed on many of Merritt's albums, including the critically acclaimed 1999 album 69 Love Songs, and frequently appears with him live as part of the usual quartet that constitutes The Magnetic Fields.

Gonson has been Merritt's longtime manager. She appears extensively in Strange Powers, the 2009 documentary by Kerthy Fix and Gail O'Hara about Merritt and the Magnetic Fields.

As well as her work with Stephin Merritt, Gonson also plays drums in the band Tender Trap. She has written and performed her own music with Shirley Simms, Michael Hearst, Tanya Donelly and Rick Moody. She has also played drums in Providence, Rhode Island-based band Honeybunch and performs as the lead vocalist in Merritt's Future Bible Heroes project. She sang on Neil Gaiman's song "Bloody Sunrise"

In an interview with The Advocate, Gonson remarked:

'"When we started Magnetic Fields we purposely had one lesbian, one gay guy, one straight woman, and one straight man. The audience could identify with whomever they wanted."''

In that interview, Gonson noted that she feels that Merritt's songs are predominantly about "Loneliness, isolation, and the need to be recognized by another person." She believes that if homophobia were not so prevalent, these experiences "would be less rampant instead of being so associated with the gay personality." Gonson believes that many LGBT youth have listened to The Magnetic Fields for "words of wisdom."

In 2010, she gave birth to her daughter Eve.

References

External links
Interview with drummergirl.com
Interview with Unmoveable Feast
 Interview with LA weekly's Vaginal Davis
 My Reading Life
 Saveur.com- I Love My Kitchen Because...

1968 births
Living people
American rock pianists
American women songwriters
Songwriters from Massachusetts
Columbia University alumni
Harvard University alumni
The Magnetic Fields members
American women drummers
American rock drummers
American lesbian musicians
American LGBT singers
American LGBT songwriters
Lesbian singers
Lesbian songwriters
Concord Academy alumni
20th-century American drummers
20th-century American women singers
20th-century American women pianists
21st-century American women singers
21st-century American singers
21st-century American women pianists
20th-century American LGBT people
21st-century American LGBT people
American lesbian writers